Thieffry is a Brussels Metro station on the eastern branch of line 5. It is located in the municipality of Etterbeek, in the eastern part of Brussels, Belgium. The station opened in 1976 and is named after the Belgian aviator Edmond Thieffry. This part of line 1A became part of line 5 in April 2009.

External links

Etterbeek
Brussels metro stations
Railway stations opened in 1976